Ha-Chatzer (Hebrew: , The Courtyard) is a 2003 Israeli telenovela on the lives of Hasidic Jews in Israel. The show was popular even among the religious Jewish community in Israel. The actor Amos Lavi played the role of the Hasidic Rebbe.

See also 
 A Life Apart: Hasidism in America (1981)

References 

Films about Orthodox and Hasidic Jews